Events in the year 1924 in the Kingdom of Italy.

Incumbents
King – Victor Emmanuel III 
Prime Minister – Benito Mussolini

Events

27 January – Treaty of Rome (1924)
6 April – Italian general election, 1924
6 October – 1-RO begins regular radio broadcasting services

Sport
25 January to 5 February – Italy participated at the 1924 Winter Olympics in Chamonix, with 23 competitors in 4 sports
4 May to 27 July – Italy participated at the 1924 Winter Olympics in Paris, with 200 competitors in 18 sports, winning a total of 16 medals (8 gold, 3 silver and 5 bronze)

Unknown
 – The Benito Mussolini government pass a law in 1924 requiring that every school display a Crucifix.

Births

2 February – Ignazio Colnaghi, actor (d. 2017)
8 March – Walter Chiari, actor (d. 1991) 
23 April – Rossana Rossanda, politician and journalist (d. 2020)
30 June – Maino Neri, footballer (d. 1995)
9 July – Domenico Pace, fencer (d. 2022)
13 July - Carlo Bergonzi, operatic tenor (d. 2014)
4 August – Antonio Maccanico, Italian constitutional specialist, social liberal politician (d. 2013)
25 August – Sergio Bergonzelli, director, screenwriter, producer and actor (d. 2002)
19 September – Rosario Mazzola, Roman Catholic prelate (d. 2018)
8 November – Gino Scarpa, painter, printmaker and sculptor (d. 2022)
18 December – Alberto Ablondi, bishop (d. 2010)

Deaths

8 April – Fiorenzo Bava Beccaris, general, known for the Bava Beccaris massacre (b. 1831)
10 June – Giacomo Matteotti, politician (b. 1885)
17 July – Ricciotti Garibaldi, soldier (b. 1847)

Full date missing
Tito Conti, painter (b. 1842)
Francesco Franceschi, horticulturist (b. 1843)

References 

 
1920s in Italy
Years of the 20th century in Italy
Italy
Italy